The Humbert Falls is a waterfall in the Marojejy National Park in North-Eastern Madagascar. It is situated approximately 800m from Camp Mantella and 4.3 km from the entrance of the park.

References

External links
video of Humbert Falls on Youtube

Waterfalls of Madagascar
Sava Region